Grábóc is a village in Tolna County, Hungary.

Populated places in Tolna County
Serb communities in Hungary